Cristobal Arreola (born March 5, 1981) is an American professional boxer who has challenged three times for the WBC heavyweight title. He was ranked by BoxRec as the world's No.8 heavyweight at the conclusion of 2007 and as No.7 heavyweight from 2008 to 2010.

Early life
Arreola was born in Los Angeles, California to Mexican parents. As a child he met boxer Julio César Chávez a couple of times. Arreola said of it "I had a chance to go to his house in Culiacán because my father was from near there and my aunt lived in Culiacan. I used to go and watch him train."

Amateur career
Arreola grew up in East Los Angeles. His father was a boxer and started him boxing at the age of eight with trainer Hector Rodríguez. At 16, he had "about 200 amateur bouts" before losing interest and quitting. In 2001 at 20 he got back into boxing and after only three months of training managed to win the National Golden Gloves at the Light Heavyweight division. To win, Chris beat Dallas Vargas, who had about 300 amateur fights at the time.

After another hiatus from boxing, this time for two years, he tried to come back for the 2003 Golden Gloves but arrived shortly after the check-in deadline prompting him to turn pro.

Professional career

Early career 
In 2003, Goossen-Tutor promoted him and turned him pro at heavyweight with little fanfare. Looking back he says: "I really didn't know if boxing was going to be my career. I wasn't sure about turning pro and once I did, I just took it one fight at a time. But then I starting knocking guys out and I gradually started thinking, 'Hey, maybe I can make some money doing this'."

In 2005, he fought Domonic Jenkins who despite his record of only 6–3 held a win over Malcolm Tann (and later KOd amateur stars Victor Bisbal and Carlos Barnett). After trailing for six rounds he turned the fight around and won by KO.

In 2006, he stopped Sedreck Fields, Cuban Damian Norris (who later defeated the unbeaten Roderick Willis) and in a match of unbeaten Californian prospects Damian Wills (coming in at 22–0–0–0).

In 2007, he KOd former amateur star Zakeem Graham (11–0). He was scheduled to fight undefeated Olympian Devin Vargas, brother of his amateur foe Dallas Vargas, but knocked out late sub Malcolm Tann when Vargas got injured in training, in May 2007 on ShoBox. He KO'd Thomas Hayes (record 27–0–0–0) in September 2007, in round 1.

On June 21, 2008, Arreola faced fellow undefeated prospect Chazz Witherspoon (23-0) and defeated him via disqualifaction.

On November 29, 2008, Arreola faced Travis Walker and knocked him out early in the 3rd round, improving Arreola's record to 26–0.

By June 2008, Arreola was ranked in the top 10 by all four major governing bodies.

Arreola defeated the previously retired heavyweight veteran Jameel McCline (40-8 23 KO's) on April 11, 2009, with a knockout at 2:01 of the 4th round.

Arreola vs. Klitschko
After his win, Arreola was the number one contender to challenge Vitali Klitschko for his WBC Heavyweight title belt. Arreola was happy with his draw when it was announced they would fight in Arreola's home town. The match took place on September 26, 2009, at the Staples Center in Los Angeles. It was broadcast on HBO. Arreola's corner and the referee stopped the fight before the start of the 11th round, giving Klitschko a 10th-round RTD (TKO) victory. The final scorecards read 99–91, 99–91, and 100–89, all for Klitschko.

Rebuild after first unsuccessful WBC title challenge 
Soon after his first career loss, Arreola fought Brian Minto as an undercard for the Paul Williams vs. Sergio Martínez fight. Chris landed well with his straight right hand and eventually floored Minto in the 4th round; Minto got up at 8 and continued to get hit with right hands before being dropped again. The referee stopped the fight when Minto rose at 9 and appeared to be in no condition to proceed with the fight.

Arreola lost his next fight, to former two-division world champion Tomasz Adamek, by majority decision on 24 April 2010. Arreola was again looking out of shape for a professional boxer at the time of the fight.

Arreola in his next fight defeated Manuel Quezada in Ontario, California by a 12-round unanimous decision. Quezada was down three times in the fight: twice in the 9th round and once in the 12th. The scores (117–108) and two judges had it (118–107). Before the fight Arreola had an interview on ESPN saying that his last two defeats were because he did not train well (as well as skipping days) and stepped into the training camp weighing nearly 300 pounds. He said that he now knew how to prepare for a fight, and realizes he needs to take the training camp seriously. He came in at 256 pounds (he fought the best at 230–240, and lost his previous two weighing over 250 pounds) and fought sluggishly against a tough opponent. At the end of the fight, Arreola said he gave himself a C− for overall performance.

After his knockout over American Joey Abell on ESPN, Arreola took out title contender Nagy Aguilera in the third round. This bout was televised on Showtime's Andre Ward vs. Arthur Abraham undercard. Thirteen days after the fight with Aguilera, Cristobal knocked out tough veteran Kendrick Releford in the seventh round, as the main-event on ESPN.
He has since then won by a 10-round unanimous decision against Friday Ahunanya on July 9, and a third-round TKO over Raphael Butler on November 5, 2011, in Guanajuato Domo De La Feria, Leon, Guanajuato, Mexico.

Arreola's next fight was on the Paul Williams vs. Nobuhiro Ishida undercard at the American Bank Center, Corpus Christi, Texas, on February 18, 2012. The opponent was heavyweight contender Éric Molina. Arreola won the fight by first-round KO.

After the knockout,  Arreola created some stir in the post fight interview when he referred to Molina's promoter Don King as a "f—ing a–hole and a racist," prompting Showtime's Jim Gray to immediately terminate the interview. "Honestly Don King called me a wetback, and other Mexicans," Arreola told Fightnews.com. "That's a strong word. It's like me dropping N bombs. You don't say things like that."

Arreola vs. Stiverne I and II 
Arreola had a chance at a rematch with Vitali Klitschko in April 2013 when he faced Bermane Stiverne. Although a favorite to win the fight, Arreola was knocked down in the third round and wound up losing a unanimous decision.

On September 7, 2013, Arreola beat Seth Mitchell in a single round.

After Klitschko vacated the title in December 2013, Arreola was signed to fight Bermane Stiverne for the vacant title. On May 10, 2014, Stiverne won the title after a sixth-round knockout.

Rebuild after second unsuccessful WBC title challenge 
On March 13, 2015, Arreola made his return to the ring to face heavyweight Curtis Harper. The fight took place during the first Premier Boxing Champions on Spike TV broadcast at the Citizens Business Bank Arena in Ontario, CA. Arreola was awarded a victory by unanimous decision following 8 rounds of boxing.

On July 18, 2015, Arreola fought to a ten-round draw with Fred Kassi. The scores were 96–94 for Arreola, 95–95 on the remaining two cards.

Arreola's tight 12-round split decision victory over Travis Kauffman on Dec. 12 at the AT&T Center in San Antonio was changed to a no-decision on Jan. 5, after Arreola tested positive for marijuana.

Arreola vs. Wilder 
Arreola made his third challenge for the WBC heavyweight title when he travelled to Birmingham, Alabama on July 16, 2016, to face WBC champion Deontay Wilder. Wilder eventually won by 8th round retirement to retain his title.

Arreola vs. Kownacki 
After two consecutive wins following his loss to Deontay Wilder, Arreola faced the unbeaten Adam Kownacki in a thrilling fight on August 3, 2019. The two men put on a record-breaking heavyweight display at the Barclays Center, New York, combining to throw over 2100 punches over 12 rounds. Kownacki won a unanimous decision to give Arreola his sixth career loss, with scores of 118–110, 117–111, 117–111.

Arreola vs. Ruiz Jr. 
Following Arreola's loss to Adam Kownacki, he next returned to the ring over a year later on May 1, 2021 to face former unified heavyweight champion Andy Ruiz Jr. on Fox PPV. Ruiz Jr was ranked #6 by The Ring, #4 by the WBC and #5 by the WBA and WBO. Arreola started well and scored a second round knockdown, but ultimately lost a unanimous decision, with scores of 117–110, 118–109, 118–109.

Arreola was very unhappy with the judges' scorecards, which he expressed in his post-fight interview: "Did he [Ruiz] win? Fine. But don't tell me you're only going to give me two or three rounds. Fuck that! I'm gonna be like Dr. Dre, all y'all can suck my motherfuckin' dick!" In the post-fight press conference, he proceeded to repeat his displeasure with the judges: "These motherfuckers just straight up like fucking raped me, and don't even kiss me dude, that's some fucked up ass shit."

Professional boxing record

References

External links

Chris Arreola profile at Premier Boxing Champions
Chris Arreola interview
Chris Arreola - Profile, News Archive & Current Rankings at Box.Live

American boxers of Mexican descent
Boxers from Los Angeles
American sportspeople in doping cases
Doping cases in boxing
Heavyweight boxers
National Golden Gloves champions
1981 births
Living people
American male boxers
Light-heavyweight boxers